Arthur Joseph Soetaert (April 14, 1913 – September 14, 2006) was a provincial politician from Alberta, Canada. He served as a member of the Legislative Assembly of Alberta from 1955 to 1959 sitting with the Liberal caucus in opposition.

Political career
Soetaert ran for a seat to the Alberta Legislature in the 1952 Alberta general election. He ran in the electoral district of St. Albert under the Liberal banner. Soetaert lost to incumbent MLA Lucien Maynard in a hotly contested race finishing a close second with vote transfers in the second count.

Soetaert ran for a second time in the 1955 Alberta general election. He faced Maynard again and ended up winning on the fourth count in vote transfers. He ran for his second term in the 1959 election but was defeated by Social Credit candidate Keith Everitt.

Soetaert died on September 14, 2006.

References

External links
Legislative Assembly of Alberta Members Listing

1913 births
2006 deaths
Alberta Liberal Party MLAs
Politicians from Edmonton